The International Castle Research Society (ICRS)  was established in Aachen in 1986 as a not-for-profit organization following earlier initiatives by Bernhard Siepen, architect, who has been its president since 2000. Early supporters were the long-standing Aachen member of parliament, Dr. Hans Stercken, and Consul Cornel Renfert, of the Franco-German Chamber of Commerce, Paris.

Background
The first model, the Donjon of Coucy, was started in 1997, with a number of models following, the latest being the Castel del Monte. Whereas the earlier models were of French fortified keeps, or donjons, then Crusader castles and bazaars as well as medieval ships, for some time now ICRS has been working on creating models of palaces typical of the 9th to 12th centuries. There are also plans for a model of the imperial Aachen palace of Charlemagne, dating from around AD 800, and of historic buildings in Jerusalem.

ICRS activities 
The president, team and ICRS consultants:
create models of historic buildings, ships, life- scenes
bring these models to life peopling them with hand-painted figurines
present models, descriptions, plans of important castles
organize seminars, talks, multimedia shows as well as visits to exhibitions and existing historic buildings
support and organize research study courses on historic buildings at school and university level
train young people in handicrafts relating to creating models

Models 
Models created by ICRS based on historical sources, at 1/25 of natural size

Exhibitions 
More than one million people in both in Europe and North America so far have visited ICRS exhibitions.

Publications 
Französische Donjons, ed. Bernhard Siepen, Aachen 2002, 
Wohntürme, ed. Heinz Müller, Langenweißbach 2002, 
Ile de France gothique – 2 – Les demeures seigneuriales, ed. Jean Mesqui, Paris 1988, 
Châteaux et enceintes de la France Médiévale, ed.Jean Mesqui, Paris 1991, 
Les programmes résidentiels du château de Coucy du XIIIe au XVIe siècle, ed. Jean Mesqui, Paris 1994
Burgen und Basare der Kreuzfahrerzeit, eds. Hans Altmann and Bernhard Siepen, Fulda 2005,  (book of the exhibition)
Burgen und Basare der Kreuzfahrerzeit, eds. Bernhard Siepen, Karina Kisza and Nina Radermacher (painting book), Fulda 2005, 
Spuren der Kreuzfahrer – Modelle, eds. Bernhard Siepen and Ulrich Alertz, Aachen 2009, 
Damaskus – Aleppo – 5000 Jahre Stadtentwicklung in Syrien, eds Mammoun Fansa, Heinz Gaube, Jens Windelberg, Mainz 2000, 
Castel del Monte – Forschungsergebnisse der Jahre 1990 bis 1996, ed. Wulf Schirmer, Mainz 2000, 
Wissenschaft und Technik im Islam, Einführung in die Geschichte der arabisch-islamischen Wissenschaften, ed. Fuat Sezgin, Frankfurt am Main 2003,

External links 
  in English, French, German
  in English, French, German

Castles
History organisations based in Germany
Organizations established in 1986